George Jackman II (1837–1887) was an English horticulturist and nurseryman, known for his work on early clematis hybrids. One of his first successful Clematis hybrids was C. 'Jackmanii'.

Family business 
Jackman's Nursery was founded by his paternal grandfather, William Jackman (1763–1840) in 1810, at St. Johns, Woking, Surrey. It occupied . The nursery was taken on by William's son George Jackman (1801–1869), whose eldest son was George Jackman II. By 1851, it had  and 41 staff. In the late 1880s the land was sold for development, and the business moved to a new site nearby, where it survives as Woking Garden Centre, in the "Garden Club" chain. It ceased being called Jackman's in 1996.

Career 
George Junior and his father started to hybridise Clematis in July 1858. Clematis 'Jackmanii' resulted from the first batch, and was awarded the Royal horticultural Society's First Class Certificate in August 1863.

With Thomas Moore, he co-authored The Clematis as a Garden Flower (1872; revised 1877). 

Jackman's papers are in Surrey History Centre.

Cultivars 
Among the many Clematis introduced by Jackman are:

Bibliography

References 

1837 births
Place of birth missing
1887 deaths
Place of death missing
People from Woking
English horticulturists